Floriade 1960 was a horticultural exhibition and garden festival held in Rotterdam, Netherlands which took place from 25 March to 25 September 1960 in Het Park near the Meuse River. It was the first edition of the Floriade to be organised under the auspices of the Association of International Horticultural Producers (AIPH) and also the first international horticultural exposition to be recognised by the Bureau International des Expositions .

To mark the occasion of the Floriade, the Euromast was built and inaugurated. The tower was 107 meters high, making it the tallest structure in the city. The tower's height was increased after the end of the Floriade.

Gallery

References

External links

 Official website of the BIE

International horticultural exhibitions
1960 in the Netherlands
Rotterdam
Festivals in the Netherlands
Garden festivals in the Netherlands
1960 festivals
Floriade (Netherlands)